The 1828 Kentucky gubernatorial election was held on August 4, 1828.

Incumbent Democratic-Republican Governor Joseph Desha was term-limited, and could not seek a second consecutive term.

National Republican nominee Thomas Metcalfe defeated Democratic nominee William T. Barry with 50.45% of the vote.

General election

Candidates
William T. Barry, Democratic, former Secretary of State of Kentucky
Thomas Metcalfe, National Republican, former U.S. Representative

Results

See also
Old Court – New Court controversy

References

1828
Kentucky
Gubernatorial